USS L-11 (SS-51) was an L-class submarine of the United States Navy.

Description
The L-class boats designed by Electric Boat (L-1 to L-4 and L-9 to L-11) were built to slightly different specifications from the other L boats, which were designed by Lake Torpedo Boat, and are sometimes considered a separate class. They displaced  on the surface and  submerged. The L-class submarines had a crew of 28 officers and enlisted men.

For surface running, the Electric Boat submarines were powered by two  diesel engines, each driving one propeller shaft. When submerged each propeller was driven by a  electric motor. They could reach  on the surface and  underwater.

The boats were armed with four 18 inch (450 mm) torpedo tubes in the bow. They carried four reloads, for a total of eight torpedoes. The Electric Boat submarines were initially not fitted with a deck gun; a single 3"/50 caliber gun on a disappearing mount was added during the war.

Construction and career

Assigned to the Atlantic Submarine Flotilla, L-11 operated along the East Coast developing new techniques of undersea warfare until April 1917. After the United States's entry into World War I, submarines were needed to protect Allied shipping lanes to Europe, and L-11 departed Boston, Massachusetts, on 4 December to undertake the task. Following a period of patrol and repair in the Azores, the submarine arrived Ireland in mid-February 1918 to Join Submarine Division 5 (SubDiv 5) in anti-submarine patrol off the British Isles. For the next nine months, she ranged shipping lanes, sighting enemy U-boats on three occasions. On 11 May, she made a torpedo attack on an enemy submarine with inconclusive results.

After the Armistice with Germany, L-11 operated out of the Isle of Portland, England, until 3 January 1919 when she sailed for the United States. Arriving Philadelphia, Pennsylvania, on 1 February, she operated off the East Coast for the next four years developing submarine warfare tactics. L-11 decommissioned at Hampton Roads, Virginia, on 28 November 1923, and was scrapped on 28 November 1933.

Notes

References

External links
 

United States L-class submarines
World War I submarines of the United States
Ships built in Quincy, Massachusetts
1916 ships